Taguhi is an Armenian female given name. The name means "queen". Notable people with this name include:

 Taguhi Hakobian (1878-1947), Armenian actress, also known as Hasmik
 Taguhi Ghazaryan (born 1991), Armenian politician
 Taguhi Tovmasyan (born 1982), Armenian politician

References